Willis Keith Baldwin (March 17, 1857 in Baldwin's Mills, Canada East – April 19, 1935) was a Canadian politician and lumber merchant. He was elected to the House of Commons of Canada as a Member of the Laurier Liberals to represent the riding of Stanstead. He was re-elected as a Liberal in 1921 and again in 1925 and 1926.

Electoral record

External links 
 

1857 births
1935 deaths
Laurier Liberals
Liberal Party of Canada MPs
Members of the House of Commons of Canada from Quebec